Beau McCoy (born November 12, 1980) is an American politician who served as a member of the Nebraska Legislature for the 39th district from 2009 to 2017.

Early life and education 
McCoy was born in Burlington, Colorado, has been active in the Republican Party since his teens. He earned a Bachelor of Arts degree in leadership, from Bellevue University, where he was the national committeeman for the Nebraska chapter of the Young Republicans.

Career
Prior to entering politics, McCoy worked as a home improvement contractor. He was elected to the Nebraska legislature in 2008 and re-elected in 2012. During his tenure, he served as vice chair of the Banking, Commerce and Insurance Committee and chair of the Committee on Committees. McCoy was also vice chair of the Council of State Governments and chair of the Midwestern Council of State Governments.

McCoy was a Republican candidate in the 2014 Nebraska gubernatorial election, placing third in the Republican primary.

Positions
McCoy identifies himself as pro-life. According to McCoy, he "support[s] our Second Amendment rights", believes in the death penalty, and opposes "in-state tuition benefits for illegal aliens."

References

External links

 State Senator Beau McCoy Nebraska Legislature website

1980 births
Bellevue University alumni
Living people
Republican Party Nebraska state senators
People from Burlington, Colorado
Politicians from Omaha, Nebraska
21st-century American politicians